Carmen Ros Nortes, NSC (born 20 November 1953) is a Spanish nun and missionary, current Undersecretary of the Congregation for Institutes of Consecrated Life and Societies of Apostolic Life, the second highest-ranking department of the Roman Curia, the administrative institution of the Holy See since 23 February 2018, when was appointed by Pope Francis.

Biography
Ros was born on 20 December 1953 in the Espinardo neighborhood of Murcia, Spain.

In Spain, she qualified in Human Sciences and Catechetical Pedagogy and got a degree in Theology specialized in Mariology for the Pontifical Theological Faculty "Marianum" (Rome) in 1985.

She has served in various offices within her Order and worked as a missionary in South Korea.

On 1 January 1992, she joined the staff of the Congregation for Institutes of Consecrated Life and Societies of Apostolic Life and worked in several of its departments, including as a teacher in its Studium, its school of theology and law for consecrated life.

She was the Congregation's special envoy to the seventh Latin American and Caribbean Encounter for Consecrated Life in Quito, Ecuador, in 2014.

References 

1953 births
Living people
Women officials of the Roman Curia
20th-century Spanish nuns
Spanish Roman Catholic missionaries
Female Roman Catholic missionaries
People from Murcia
21st-century Spanish nuns